Albanians in Greece are people of Albanian ethnicity or ancestry who live in or originate from areas within modern Greece. They are divided into distinct communities as a result of different waves of migration. Albanians first migrated into Greece during the late 13th century. The descendants of populations of Albanian origin who settled in Greece during the Middle Ages are the Arvanites, who have been fully assimilated into the Greek nation and self-identify as Greeks. Today, they still maintain their distinct subdialect of Tosk Albanian, known as Arvanitika, although it is endangered as the younger generations no longer speak it due to language attrition.

The Chams are an Albanian group from the coastal parts of Epirus, in northwestern Greece and the southernmost part of Albania. The Chams of Muslim faith were expelled from Epirus during World War II after large parts of their population collaborated with the Axis occupation forces. Greek Orthodox Albanian communities have been assimilated into the Greek nation.

Alongside these two groups, a large wave of economic migrants from Albania entered Greece after the fall of Communism (1991) and forms the largest expatriate community in the country. They form the largest migrant group in Greece. A portion of these immigrants avoid declaring as Albanian in order to avoid prejudices and exclusion. These Albanian newcomers may resort to self-assimilation tactics such as changing their Albanian name to Greek ones and, if they are Muslim their religion from Islam to Orthodoxy: Some Albanians with a Muslim background may change their names in order to avoid problems in predominately Orthodox Christian Greece. Through this, they hope to attain easier access to visas and naturalisation. After migration to Greece, most are baptized and integrated.

While Greece does not record ethnicity on censuses, Albanians form the largest ethnic minority and top immigrant population in the country. As of 2022, Albanian permit holders in Greece have decreased to emigration to wealtheir countries, with only 291,868 Albanians having legal permits.

Native Albanian communities

Cham Albanians and Souliotes

Groups of Albanians are first recorded in Epirus during the high Middle Ages. Some of their descendants form the Cham Albanians, which formerly inhabited the coastal regions of Epirus, largely corresponding to Thesprotia. The Chams are primarily distinguished from other Albanian groups by their distinct dialect of Tosk Albanian, the Cham dialect, which is among the most conservative of the Albanian dialects. During the rule of the Ottoman Empire in Epirus, many Chams converted to Islam, while a minority remained Greek Orthodox.

The Souliotes were a distinct subgroup of Cham Albanians who lived in the Souli region, and were known for the role in the Greek War of Independence.

When Epirus joined Greece in 1913, following the Balkan Wars, Muslim Chams lost the privileged status they enjoyed during Ottoman rule and were subject to discrimination from time to time. During World War II, large parts of the Muslim Chams collaborated with the Axis occupation forces, committing atrocities against the local population. In 1944, when the Axis withdrew, many Muslim Chams fled to Albania or were forcibly expelled by the EDES resistance group. This event is known as the expulsion of Cham Albanians.

Communities of Albanian descent

Southern Greece 

The Arvanites are by a community composed of the Southern Albanian dialectological group of Arvanitika speakers, known as Arvanites. They are a population group in Greece who traditionally speak Arvanitika, a form of Tosk Albanian. They settled in Greece during the late Middle Ages and were the dominant population element of some regions in the south of Greece until the 19th century. Arvanites today self-identify as Greeks and have largely assimilated into mainstream Greek culture, they retain their dialect Arvanitika and cultural similarities with Albanians, but refuse any national connection with them and do not consider themselves an ethnic minority. Albanian remained a "second language" in the Greek navy into the 20th century. Arvanitika is endangered due to language shift towards Greek and large-scale internal migration to the cities in recent decades. The Arvanites are not considered an ethnic minority within Greece.

Epirus 
Historically, aside from the Cham and Souliote settlements, Albanians have also been formed communities in other areas of Epirus. Those Christian Albanians found in Epirus entirely identify with the Greek nation. A small community is located in the Ioannina regional unit, where they form a majority in two villages of the Konitsa district. Albanian communities also reside in the village of Plikati. Although they are sometimes called Arvanites, their dialects are part of Tosk Albanian rather than Arvanitika. This population speaks the Lab branch of the Albanian language. 

The victory of the invading Albanian tribes in the Battle of Achelous   left Epirus left open to increasing Albanian migration, who soon captured most of it, except for Ioannina. Arta was captured In 1367 or shortly after, becoming the centre of the "Despotate of Arta". and being recaptured only in 1416.

In the city of Ioannina, a substantial minority of Albanian-speakers existed who spoke a dialect intermediate between Cham and Lab. However, during Ottoman era the Albanian minority in the kaza of Ioannina did not consist of native families but was limited to some Ottoman public servants. Albanian communities historically have also inhabited Konitsa, Delvinaki, Pogoniani, Gorgopotamos, Mousiotitsa, the villages of Agia, Ammoudia, Anthousa, Kanallaki and Narkissos as well as the village of Kastri, these being located in the regional units of Ioannina, Preveza and Thesprotia respectively.

Over the centuries, some groups of Albanians also settled in various villages of Zagori. Most of the Albanian settlement in Zagori can be attributed to after the 15th century and was the result of labor gaps caused by the outward migration of locals, as well as movements of groups like the Souliotes. These Albanians (locally known as ) were considered  'immigrants'; they comprised the lowest social class in the region and lived at the outskirts of the villages without civil and property rights. They often worked as guards for the villages which had no military protection, and as workers in their fields. They intermarried into the communities of Zagori or were adopted by Zagorisian families and quickly became part of the local population. Besides Tristeno, Albanians also settled in the villages of Arísti, Megalo Papingo, Anthrakítis, Asprángeli, Kavallári, Kípi, Leptokaryá, Monodéndri, Tsepélovo, Vítsa, Vradéto and possibly Kapésovo. Local Albanian traces, with the exception of some toponyms, have disappeared; an extensive study of 3,546 toponyms in Zagori, found that 184 (5.19%) were mediated via the Albanian language.

Macedonia 

The region of Macedonia also saw Albanian settlement. In the modern era only a small group of Christian, Albanian-speakers, speakers of a Northern Tosk Albanian dialect are still to be found in the villages of Drosopigi, Flampouro, Lechovo in Florina regional unit. During the Ottoman era however, the Albanian population of the region was more widespread. These communities were largely found in and around the cities of Florina and Kastoria. Muslim Albanians inhabited the city of Florina itself, along with the nearby villages of Pyli, Lefkonas, Laimos, Agios Germanos, Tropaiouchos, Kolchiki, Agios Vartholomaios,  Kato Kleines, and Ano Kleines. On the other hand, Christian Orthodox Albanians resided in the villages of Kato Ydroussa, Ano Ydroussa and Tripotamos, with these communities utilizing Albanian at least until the 1990s.

In Kastoria, Albanians in the city itself as well as the surrounding village of Giannochorio were Christian Orthodox, whereas Muslim Albanians inhabited the villages of Pefkos, Niki, Koromilia, Dipotamia, and Komninades.

In the area of Grevena, the village of Syndendro was inhabited by a Muslim Albanian population.

Following the October 1913 looting of the Albanian village of Mandritsa, Albanians settled the villages of Amparkioi (later renamed Mandres in their honor) in the Kilkis regional unit, as well as the villages of Souroti and Zagliveri in the Thessaloniki regional unit.

Sporadic Albanian communities, Christian Orthodox by faith, have further settled in other areas of Macedonia, including the villages of Nea Petra, Kalochori and Paralimnoi in the Serres regional unit. 

Those small Arvanite-speaking communities in Epirus and the Florina regional unit are identified as part of the Greek nation as well.

Thessaly
The Malakasioi along with other Albanian tribes, the Bua and the Mesareti invaded Thessaly after 1318. Traces of the Malakasioi are evident in the settlement of Malakasi, which takes the name of the tribe.

Western Thrace

Another small group is to be found in northeastern Greece, in Greek Macedonia and Western Thrace along the border with Turkey, as a result of migration during the early 20th century. They speak the Northern Tosk subbranch of Tosk Albanian and are descendants of the Orthodox Albanian population of Eastern Thrace who were forced to migrate during the population exchange between Greece and Turkey in the 1920s. They are known in Greece as Arvanites, a name applied to all groups of Albanian origin in Greece, but which primarily refers to the southern dialectological group of Arbëreshë. The Albanian speakers of Western Thrace and Macedonia use the common Albanian self-appellation Shqiptar.

Albanian immigrants
After the fall of the communist government in Albania in 1990, a large number of economic immigrants from Albania arrived in Greece, mostly illegally, and seeking employment. Recent economic migrants from Albania are estimated to account for 60–65% of the total number of immigrants in the country. According to the 2001 census, there were 443,550 Albanian immigrants in Greece.
A special ID card for ethnic Greeks from Albania was issued in 2001 which was received by  189,000 individuals who resided in Greece at the time. For ethnic Greeks from Albania this measure was seen as treating them as "lower class citizens" as in order to obtain it their "Greekness" was examined in the form of a questionnaire. Another issue with the special ID card had to do with ethnic Albanians using fake documents which presented them as members of the Greek minority to obtain it. In 2008, the citizenship law change in Greece allowed for holders of special ID cards to obtain Greek citizenship and about 45,000 did so just in the first three years of its implementation. , the number of Albanian citizens who are holders of special IDs as homogeneis (Greek co-ethnics) has been reduced to 13,329.

In the 2011 census, 480,851 Albanian immigrants were recorded in Greece. Accounting for non-permanent or irregular migration which constitutes up to 30% of Albanian immigrants in Greece, other estimates put their number closer to 600,000-670,000 (~6% of the total population of Greece). Since the Greek economic crisis started in 2011, the total number of Albanians in Greece has fluctuated. According to a study of 2012 conducted in Albania it is estimated that around 18%-22% Albanian immigrants returned to Albania the last five years. As of 2019, Greece was the second top destination for Albanians, as movement to Greece constituted 35.3% of total Albanian immigration. Albanian immigrants are the largest immigrant community in Greece. In recent years many Albanian workers and their families have left Greece for other countries in Europe in search of better prospects. In 2022, the number of Albanian citizens in Greece with a valid residency permit was 291,868; down from 422,954 in 2021. , in total, there might have been more than 500,000 Albanian-born migrants and their children who received Greek citizenship over the years.

Albanians have a long history of Hellenisation, assimilation and integration in Greece. Despite social and political problems experienced by the wave of immigration in the 1980s and 1990s, Albanians have integrated better in Greece than other non-Greeks. A portion of Albanian newcomers change their Albanian name to Greek ones and their religion, if they are not Christian, from Islam to Orthodoxy. Even before emigration, some Albanians from the south of Albania adopt a Greek identity including name changes, adherence to the Orthodox faith, and other assimilation tactics in order to avoid prejudices against migrants in Greece. In this way, they hope to get valid visas and eventual naturalization in Greece.

Notable people

See also
Minorities in Greece
Albanians in Kosovo
Albanians in Serbia
Albanians in Montenegro

References

Bibliography